ISSR may refer to:
 International Society for Science and Religion
 inter-simple sequence repeat, a general term for a genome region between microsatellite loci.
 Institute of Statistical Studies and Research
 International School of the Stockholm Region